Simon Kelner (born 9 December 1957) is a British journalist and newspaper editor.

Kelner studied at Bury Grammar School. His older brother is the journalist and broadcaster Martin Kelner. He is Jewish. He started work at Neath Guardian in 1976. In 1980 he moved on to the Kent Evening Post. He became assistant sports editor of The Observer in 1983. He became deputy sports editor of The Independent in 1986. In 1989 he worked on the Observer magazine and then became Daily Mail magazine editor. Kelner was editor-in-chief of The Independent and Independent on Sunday newspapers from May 1998 to 2008, succeeding Andrew Marr and Rosie Boycott. After a stint as Managing Director of The Independent titles he was re-appointed editor in April 2010 by the new owner, Alexander Lebedev. Kelner won several awards during his employment at The Independent, including Editor of the Year in 2004 and 2010.

References

External links

1957 births
People educated at Bury Grammar School
Living people
People from Bury, Greater Manchester
Alumni of the University of Central Lancashire
English newspaper editors
English male journalists
I (newspaper) journalists
The Independent editors
British Jews
British newspaper journalists
British republicans